"Latch" is a song by English electronic music duo Disclosure, featuring vocals from English singer Sam Smith. It was released as a digital download on 8 October 2012, by PMR Records. The lead single from their debut studio album, Settle (2013), the song debuted on the UK Singles Chart at number 26 and peaked at number 11. In the United States, "Latch" was a sleeper hit, peaking at number seven on the US Billboard Hot 100 in August 2014.

In 2022, American magazine Rolling Stone ranked "Latch" number 10 in their list of 200 Greatest Dance Songs of All Time.

Background and composition
Originally, Disclosure thought that "Latch" was "too weird for the radio and not clubby enough for the clubs" because of its time signature. The band stated: "It's in 6/8 time — not even 4/4, the more commonly used time signature for house music."

Howard has stated that Disclosure is "trying to bring some soul into the songwriting... using jazz chords and interesting melodies instead of boring, stabby EDM triads."

Guy Lawrence has declined to say definitively what the key of Latch is, but in a text message to Disclosure, Jacob Collier argued for the key being F minor, calling the tonality "a sick flavorsome F minor because all the bass notes are avoiding [the root note]."  Latch has a tempo of 122 beats per minute.

Critical reception
Michael Cragg of The Guardian wrote of the song: "it's a slowly unravelling ode to the thrill of wanting to figuratively (and possibly literally) latch on to someone else." Jon Caramanica of The New York Times viewed the track as one of the duo's "least characteristic" songs, describing it as "less relaxed, more ambitious, more blatantly pop-oriented, with full-bodied vocals". Jamieson Cox lauded the song in The Verge: "Latch" is a "song that remains this decade’s prototypical piece of dance-pop. There’s no such thing as a perfect song, but 'Latch' comes close: it’s economic, beguiling, and precise."

Commercial performance
On 10 October 2012, Greg James announced that "Latch" was at number 39 on The Official Chart Update, officially entering the UK Singles Chart at number 26 on 14 October 2012, climbing 13 places during the course of the week. In its second week, the song climbed nine places to number 17 and in its third climbed five places to number 12; it eventually peaked at number 11 in its fourth week. The song spent a total of 15 weeks within the top 40 and 32 weeks within the top 75. The song has sold over 1,200,000 copies in the UK alone, with it being certified 2× Platinum by the BPI. This puts "Latch" among the best-selling singles to not reach the top 10 of the UK Singles Chart. The single was also certified Gold by the Federazione Industria Musicale Italiana.

In 2014, "Latch" became a sleeper hit in the United States. The song was released as their debut single in the United States on 4 February 2014. On the chart dated 2 August, it topped the Billboard Dance/Electronic Songs chart during its forty-seventh week on the chart, marking the longest trip to the summit of that chart (where it remained through the chart dated 30 August). Having sold 990,000 units at the mid-way point of 2014, "Latch" reigned as one of the top-selling Dance/Electronic Songs according to Nielsen SoundScan. The song became a contemporary hit radio crossover-hit. It was the duo's first, and Smith's second, top 10 single at pop, adult pop, rhythmic, urban and urban AC radio in the US, peaking at numbers three, 10, three and nine respectively. On the chart dated 9 August, "Latch" peaked at number seven on the US Billboard Hot 100.

Music video
A music video to accompany the release of "Latch" was first released onto YouTube on 9 October 2012, with a run time of 04:17. The video short was directed by Ross McDowell and Ben Murray of London's Bullion Collective and features scenes of several couples flirting and embracing. One of the couples is home inside an apartment, another meet in a crowded elevator and begin to kiss once the others on the elevator have left and the third couple is two young women who meet in a bar. Sam Smith does not appear in the video. As of February 2022, the video has almost 400 million views on YouTube.

Track listings
 Digital download
 "Latch"  – 4:16
 Digital remixes
 "Latch"  – 4:07
 "Latch"  – 6:31
 Vinyl
 "Latch"  – 4:16
 "Latch"  – 4:07
 In the Lonely Hour
 "Latch"  – 3:43

Charts

Weekly charts

Year-end charts

Decade-end charts

Certifications

Release history

References

2012 singles
Cherrytree Records singles
Disclosure (band) songs
Interscope Records singles
Sam Smith (singer) songs
Songs written by Sam Smith (singer)
Songs written by Jimmy Napes
Songs written by Guy Lawrence
Songs written by Howard Lawrence
Torch songs
2012 songs